Alan Judge is the name of:
 Alan Judge (English footballer) (born 1960), former footballer 
Alan Judge (footballer, born 1988) (born 1988), Irish footballer